Lee Chin Cheh is a Malaysian politician and the former Selangor state assemblyman of the Kajang seat. He became infamous for vacating his seat at Kajang on 27 January 2014.

Kajang Move

In the general elections in 2013, he won by a majority of 6,824 votes against 5 other candidates .

The first stage of the "Kajang Move" was a by-election held for the Selangor State Assembly seat of Kajang on 23 March 2014. The seat was vacated after the incumbent PKR assemblyman, Lee Chin Cheh resigned on 27 January 2014. Lee had won the seat by a majority of 6,824 votes, against five other candidates, in the 2013 election.

References

Year of birth missing (living people)
Living people
Malaysian people of Chinese descent
People's Justice Party (Malaysia) politicians
Members of the Selangor State Legislative Assembly